Antoine Joseph (born October 27, 1989) is a Haitian professional basketball player.

Early years
Joseph was born in Haiti, raised in Pétion-Ville, a suburb of Port-au-Prince. He emigrated to the United States and played college basketball at Union University in Tennessee, a school which has become a haven for many top Haitian talent over the years. He studied business management, and completed all four years obtaining a bachelor's degree.

Professional career
Joseph has played for Argentina TNA, and for the Dep. Pucon of Chile in the Liga Movistar. In 2014, he tried out for the Fort Wayne Mad Ants, an NBA Development League team, who is currently attempting a shot at the NBA.

In October 2021, Joseph was on the roster of Zambian champions Matero Magic in the 2022 BAL Qualifying Tournaments.

References

External links

1989 births
Living people
Haitian sportspeople
Power forwards (basketball)
Haitian men's basketball players